Jim C. Barnett (December 8, 1926 – July 26, 2013) was an American physician and politician who served from 1992 to 2008 in the Mississippi House of Representatives.

Born in Edinburg in Leake County in central Mississippi, Barnett served in the United States Navy during World War II and as a naval flight surgeon during the Korean War. He went to Millsaps College in the capital city of Jackson, Mississippi, Tulane University in New Orleans, Louisiana, and the University of Mississippi Medical School. He graduated from the University of Texas Southwestern Medical Center in Dallas. Engaged in family practice and surgery in Lincoln County, he resided in Brookhaven. He died at St. Dominic Hospital in Jackson at the age of eighty-six.

In the legislature, Barnett worked successfully to bring the Mississippi School of the Arts to Brookhaven. A pilot, Barnett served for twelve years as the chairman of the Mississippi Aeronautics Commission. He was a member and chairman of the Mississippi Board of Mental Health. The mental health unit in Brookhaven is named in his honor.

References

1926 births
2013 deaths
People from Leake County, Mississippi
People from Brookhaven, Mississippi
Millsaps College alumni
Tulane University alumni
University of Mississippi Medical Center alumni
University of Texas Southwestern Medical Center alumni
Physicians from Mississippi
Republican Party members of the Mississippi House of Representatives
United States Navy officers
United States Navy personnel of World War II
United States Navy personnel of the Korean War
Military personnel from Mississippi
American United Methodists
20th-century Methodists